In comics, Masked Marvel may refer to:

Masked Marvel (Marvel Comics), an alternate name of Speedball, a Marvel Comics character
Masked Marvel (Centaur Publications), a Centaur Publications character